World Seagrass Day is an annual event held on March 1 to raise awareness about seagrass and its important functions in the marine ecosystem.

Background 
On 27 May 2022, United Nations General Assembly adopted a resolution on World Seagrass Day in document A/76/L.56) on the fact that seagrass ecosystems have a greater capacity to sequester carbon than terrestrial ecosystems. The resolution invited Member States, organizations and agencies of the United Nations, non-governmental organizations, academic institutions, private sector, to observe World Seagrass Day, in order to contribute to sustainable development and climate change mitigation and adaptation.

References 

Seagrass
Environmental awareness days
March observances